The 1935 Belgian Grand Prix was a Grand Prix motor race held at Spa-Francorchamps on 14 July 1935.

Classification

Race

Starting grid positions

Notes
 Manfred von Brauchitsch took Luigi Fagioli's car after Fagioli walked off due to an argument with team boss Alfred Neubauer.
 René Dreyfus became ill after inhaling exhaust fumes and handed his car over to Attilio Marinoni.

Belgian Grand Prix
Belgian Grand Prix
Grand Prix, 1935